The Prix Ampère de l’Électricité de France is a scientific prize awarded annually by the French Academy of Sciences.

Founded in 1974 in honor of André-Marie Ampère to celebrate his 200th birthday in 1975, the award is granted to one or more French scientists for outstanding research work in mathematics or physics.  The monetary award is 30,500 euro, funded by Électricité de France.

Winners 

 2019 : Jacqueline Bloch 
 2018 : Frank Merle
 2017 : 
 2016 :  
 2015 :  
 2014 : Gilles Chabrier
 2013 : Arnaud Beauville
 2012 : 
 2011 : 
 2010 : 
 2009 : 
 2008 : Gérard Iooss
 2007 : 
 2004, 2005, 2006 : Prize not awarded.
 2003 : Gilles Lebeau
 2002 : 
 2001 : Bernard Derrida
 2000 : Pierre Suquet
 1999 : Yves Colin de Verdière
 1998 :  and Jean-Michel Raimond
 1997 : Michèle Vergne
 1996 :  and Marc Mézard
 1995 : Claude Itzykson
 1994 : 
 1993 : Christophe Soulé
 1992 : Pierre-Louis Lions
 1991 : Michel Devoret and 
 1990 : Jean-Michel Bismut
 1989 : Adrien Douady
 1988 : Jules Horowitz
 1987 : Michel Raynaud
 1986 : 
 1985 : Haïm Brezis
 1984 : Daniel Kastler
 1983 : Claude Bouchiat, Marie-Anne Bouchiat and 
 1982 : Paul-André Meyer
 1981 : Édouard Brézin, Jean Zinn-Justin
 1980 : Alain Connes
 1979 : Claude Cohen-Tannoudji
 1978 : Pierre Cartier
 1977 : Pierre-Gilles de Gennes
 1976 : Jacques Dixmier
 1975 : André Lagarrigue
 1974 : Jean Brossel

See also

 List of mathematics awards
 List of physics awards
 List of prizes named after people

References

External links 
 

Physics awards
Mathematics awards
Awards established in 1974